Rosario Candela (March 7, 1890 – October 3, 1953) was an Italian American architect who achieved renown through his apartment building designs in New York City, primarily during the boom years of the 1920s. He is credited with defining the city's characteristic terraced setbacks and signature penthouses.  Over time, Candela's buildings have become some of New York's most coveted addresses.  As architectural historian Cristopher Gray has written: "Rosario Candela has replaced Stanford White as the real estate brokers' name-drop of choice. Nowadays, to own a 10- to 20-room apartment in a Candela-designed building is to accede to architectural as well as social cynosure."

Life

Early life and education
Born in Montelepre, Italy in 1890, Candela immigrated to New York in 1906. He returned to Italy after his arrival to study there and returned to the US in 1909. His father was Michele Candela, a plasterer, and his mother was Josephine Pizzurro. He gained admission to the Columbia University School of Architecture and graduated in 1915. Keenly aware of his talent, he went so far as to erect a velvet rope around his drafting table to prevent other students from copying his designs.

Career
After graduation, Candela worked briefly as a draftsman for the Palermo-born Italian-American architect, Gaetan Ajello. After another brief stint with the firm of Frederick Sterner, Candela set up his own practice in 1920. His first major commission was for an apartment house at West 92nd Street and Broadway. Shortly thereafter, he received his first commission for an East Side apartment at 1105 Park Avenue. During the next five years, Candela designed a number of residential buildings on the Upper West Side, primarily on West End Avenue and Riverside Drive. During this period, the West side was undergoing an intense transformation from an area of primarily single-family homes to one characterized by the apartment buildings.

Candela's greatest work would occur during the latter half of the 1920s, when he designed numerous apartment buildings on the Upper East Side, primarily on Fifth Avenue and Park Avenue, as well as at Sutton Place and other locations. In 1927 and 1928, Candela designed 19 apartment buildings, including 960 Fifth Avenue (at East 77th Street) and 720 Park Avenue (at East 70th Street). He had more commissions in 1929, but the housing boom had begun to slow prior to the stock market crash in October. Of 27 designs that year, only 12 were completed. These included 740, 770, 778 and 834 and 1040 Fifth Avenue.

The exteriors of his buildings tended to be understated, particularly in view of some of the more exuberant styles popular during the period. However, he was considered a master of design when it came to the interiors. Many apartments were constructed as duplex residences with grand entry foyers; curved, freestanding stairways; and dramatic public rooms. Some of the designs, including that of the John D. Rockefeller, Jr. triplex at 740 Park Avenue, were palatial by even the considerable standards of the day.

During the Great Depression, work fell off dramatically and Candela received only sporadic commissions. While the quantity declined considerably, the quality of his designs rarely suffered. During this time, he expressed his interest in codes and ciphers, publishing two books on the topic. He continued his practice up until his death in 1953. Chesley Bonestell, first an architect, and later a noted science fiction illustrator, painted two pictures for him, one of his home and one of his son.

Cryptography
Candela began studying cryptography in 1930 after learning about the accomplishments of the Army Signal Corps in WWI. He decrypted messages originally coded in 1898 by Commandant Étienne Bazeries of the French Army. Commandant Bazeries was "one of the most brilliant cryptologists of his era," and developed an encryption method considered unbreakable. Candela wrote a book, The Military Cipher of Commandant Bazeries, in 1938 detailing how he broke Bazeries' code. Starting in 1941, Candela taught a class on cryptography and cryptanalytics at Hunter College in New York. At the time, the course was considered the only one of its kind offered to the public in the United States. When the war came, he worked for the OSS — the forerunner of the CIA.

Books by Candela

Bibliography

 Alpern, Andrew; Christopher Gray, preface. David Netto, foreword. The New York Apartment Houses of Rosario Candela and James Carpenter. New York: Acanthus Press, 2001.

Work

Buildings
All within New York City unless otherwise noted. Source: Rosario Candela listing in Emporis Buildings

Early 1900s
575 West End Avenue, 1914

1920s

1930s
1220 Park Avenue, 1930
770 Park Avenue, 1930
1040 Fifth Avenue, 1930
1021 Park Avenue, 1930
834 Fifth Avenue, 1930
12 East 88th Street, 1931
1500 North Lake Shore Drive, Chicago, Illinois, 1931
56 Seventh Avenue, 1931
778 Park Avenue, 1931
2 Beekman Place, 1932
3 Times Square (Rialto Theatre), 1935 (replaced by Reuters Building, 2001)
Normandie Theatre (51 East 53rd Street), 1936 (demolished in the 1950s)
19 East 72nd Street, with Mott B. Schmidt, 1936
Regency Park, 1937
955 Fifth Avenue, 1938

Outside of New York City:
Personal Normandy Style home in Harrison, New York 1930
Personal homes of friends in Bronxville and Tarrytown

1940s
44 East 67th Street, 1941
135 East 54th Street, 1948
1 East 66th Street, 1948
Twin apartments on Collins Ave. In Mount Vernon abutting the Fleetwood train station.
3103 Fairfield Avenue, Riverdale, The Bronx (1949)

1950s
 Montclair on the Park, St. Louis, MO, 1951
 Public School 87, NY, NY, 1953

Projects
960 Fifth Avenue, with Warren & Wetmore, 1929

Footnotes

External links

Rosario Candela Buildings Images & Descriptions at Brick And Cornice

1890 births
1953 deaths
People from Montelepre
Italian emigrants to the United States
Architects from Sicily
20th-century American architects
American cryptographers
Columbia Graduate School of Architecture, Planning and Preservation alumni
Hunter College faculty
Recreational cryptographers